Wilhelm "Will" Decker (13 December 1899 in Rostock – 1 May 1945 near Berlin) was a German publicist, and in the time of the Third Reich the General Labour Leader.

After his Abitur, he served at the front in 1917-1918 in the First World War and afterwards studied history and Germanistics between 1919 and 1922.

By 1919 he was working as a journalist, and as of 1926, he was a freelance writer. Quite early on, Decker joined the NSDAP and as of 1929 functioned as a Gau speaker. In 1930, he was elected a member of the Reichstag.

From 1931, at the Voluntary Labour Service, Nazi leaders appointed him as "Inspector for Education and Training" in the Reich leadership.

As of 1934, Decker published the Nazi magazine "Volk an der Arbeit", whose content was so well liked by the Nazi leadership that it earned him an appointment as General Labour Leader in the Reichsarbeitsdienst (Reich Labour Service).

Alongside this, Decker had a teaching job at the University of Berlin, and was appointed an honorary professor in June 1937.

Decker kept publishing many writings having to do with the Labour Service, among them:

 1933: "Der deutsche Weg" ("The German Way")
 1935: "Die politische Aufgabe des Arbeitsdienstes" ("The Labour Service's Political Function")
 1939: "Mit dem Spaten durch Polen" ("With the Spade through Poland")

Will Decker died on 1 May 1945 – the day after Adolf Hitler's death – as he tried to get himself out of Berlin, which by now lay under the Red Army's siege. Whether he killed himself or was wounded is to this day unknown.

1899 births
1945 deaths
People from Rostock
People from the Grand Duchy of Mecklenburg-Schwerin
Nazi Party officials
Nazi Party politicians
Members of the Reichstag of the Weimar Republic
Members of the Reichstag of Nazi Germany
German civilians killed in World War II
Reich Labour Service members
German Army personnel of World War I